Estadio Federativo is a multi-use stadium in Azogues, Ecuador.  It is currently used mostly for football matches and is the home stadium of Club Deportivo Federativo of Azogues.  The stadium holds 3,400 people. 

Federativo
Buildings and structures in Cañar Province